Twenty Valley Golf and Country Club is a semi-private 18-hole golf course located in the Niagara Peninsula, in the town of Lincoln, Ontario. It is a member owned course with an elected board of directors who oversee the facility's operations

History
The course first opened in 1960 with nine holes. The remaining nine holes were ready for play in 1967. Twenty Valley was designed by golf course architect Clinton E. “Robbie” Robinson, who in 2007 was inducted into the Ontario Golf Hall of Fame. In 2009 the club celebrated their 50th anniversary with an open house, open to past and current members.

The Course
The Twenty Valley golf course covers approximately 142 acres at the intersection of Cherry Avenue and Young Street, near Campden, Ontario. Winding through the middle is the Twenty Mile Creek, which is where the club gets its name. The river makes for challenging play, with six (4, 6, 9, 10, 13, 18) of the eighteen holes playing across it. Many of the holes feature dramatic elevation changes due to the valley topography. From the gold tees, the course plays over 6,700 yards, down to 5,144 yards from the red tees.

Tournaments
 West Lincoln Memorial Hospital Foundation Golf Tournament (July 4, 2012)
 West Lincoln Memorial Hospital Foundation Golf Tournament (July 6, 2011)
 Ladies 3rd Annual Golf Classic in support of the Kidney Foundation of Canada (July 20, 2011)
 Edward Jones 9th Annual Family Tournament in support of Big Brothers & Big Sisters (June 26, 2011)
 West Niagara 12th Annual Golf Classic in support of West Niagara Second Stage and The FORT (June 1, 2011)
 Lincoln Chamber of Commerce 21st Annual Golf Tournament (May 25, 2011) 
 West Niagara 11th Annual Golf Classic in support of West Niagara Second Stage and The FORT (June 17, 2009)
 Ladies 2nd Annual Golf Classic in support of the Kidney Foundation of Canada (July 21, 2010)
 Ladies 1st Annual Golf Classic in support of the Kidney Foundation of Canada (July 22, 2009)
 West Lincoln Memorial Hospital Foundation Golf Tournament (July 8, 2009)

Scorecard

References 

Golf clubs and courses in Ontario
Regional Municipality of Niagara